Gordon Briscoe AO (born 1938) is an Aboriginal Australian academic and activist. In 1997, he became the first Indigenous person to be awarded a PhD from an Australian University. He is also a former soccer player.

Early life
Born in Alice Springs, Northern Territory, Australia, Briscoe is descended from the Marduntjara and Pitjantjatjara nations of Central Australia. He was removed from his mother as a child and was educated at St Francis House in Adelaide.

Activism
Briscoe was involved in the establishment in New South Wales of the Aboriginal Progress Association in the 1950s, the Aboriginal Legal Service in the 1960s and the Aboriginal Medical Service in 1972.

He was treasurer on the committee of the Aboriginal Publications Foundation, which published the magazine Identity, in the 1970s.

Soccer
After playing state league for Adelaide Croatia alongside Charles Perkins and John Moriarty, Briscoe moved to England in 1958 with the hope of playing professional football. He had stints at Barnet and Preston North End (although he did not make a first team appearance), before returning to Australia at the suggestion of his former schoolmate and teammate Perkins.

Briscoe, along with Perkins and Moriarty, later played recreational soccer with the Australian National University Soccer Club from 1968 to about 1972.

Academia
In 1981, Briscoe began his academic career with the Australian National University (ANU). His focus was on Indigenous history and he was involved in the production of the SBS documentary First Australians. In 1997, Briscoe became the first Indigenous person to be awarded a PhD from an Australian University. Briscoe became ANU's Centre for Indigenous History Centre inaugural Research Fellow in 2003.

Publications 
Briscoe's memoir, Racial Folly: A Twentieth-Century Aboriginal Family was published by ANU Press in 2010 as an open access book. It "shows us the history of an Aboriginal family who lived under the race laws, practices and policies of Australia in the twentieth century. It tells the story of a people trapped in ideological folly spawned to solve ‘the half-caste problem’"

He is also the author of a number of books and reports on Aboriginal health and history including: 

 Counting, Health and Identity: A History of Aboriginal Health and Demography in Western Australia and Queensland, 1900-1940 published by Aboriginal Studies Press in 2003,
 Queensland Aborigines and the Spanish Influenza Pandemic of 1918-1919 published in 1996, which 'Discusses impact of the Spanish Influenza pandemic on Queensland Aborigines who accounted for 30 per cent of the death toll in Queensland'.

References

Further reading

1938 births
Indigenous Australian soccer players
Officers of the Order of Australia
Australian indigenous rights activists
Living people
Members of the Stolen Generations
Sportsmen from the Northern Territory
People from Alice Springs
Association footballers not categorized by position
Association football players not categorized by nationality